The Morphological Catalogue of Galaxies (MCG) or Morfologiceskij Katalog Galaktik, is a Russian catalogue of 30,642 galaxies compiled by Boris Vorontsov-Velyaminov and V. P. Arkhipova. It is based on scrutiny of prints of the Palomar Sky Survey plates, and putatively complete to a photographic magnitude of 15. Including galaxies to magnitude 16 would have resulted in an unmanageably large dataset.

Publication 
The catalogue was published in five parts (chapters) between 1962 and 1974, the final chapter including a certain number of galaxies with a photographic magnitude above 15.

Gallery

References

 
Astronomical catalogues of galaxies
Astronomy in the Soviet Union